The Bumbar is a Serbian short-range portable anti-tank missile system.

Description
The Bumbar is a wire-guided, man-portable, short-ranged missile system for use against ground targets. The missile has a soft launch capability - the main motor firing after the missile has left the launcher, which allows for the missile to be fired from confined spaces, which is a necessity in urban warfare. During its flight, the rocket is maneuvered by unique system of thrust vectoring. The missile is propelled by two main rocket motor exhaust vanes located at mid body. As the missile rotates the launch units send signals commanding the correction by one of the two vanes to move against the missile motors thrust. For example, if the missile has to move to the left, the right thrust vector vane will actuate at the correct time.
It is protected against electronic countermeasures through: "Use of CCD matrix sensors, fast image processing computer and robust missile tracer recognition algorithm."

Its general design is similar to the French/Canadian Eryx MBDA anti-tank missile and has similar specifications. However MBDA has never supplied Serbia or the former Yugoslavia with technical information regarding the Eryx. so the Bumbar missile is probably reverse engineered from Eryx.

General information
 Time of flight to target at 600 m: 4.6 s
 Warhead penetration: over 1000 mm RHA behind ERA
 Range: up to 600 m
 Weapon length in travelling position: 1164 mm
 Capable of firing from confined spaces
 Night firing capability
 Mass of missile in transporting/launching tube: 14 kg
 Secondary warhead caliber: 55 mm
 LC axis superelevation angle: 10°

References

Anti-tank guided missiles of Serbia
Military Technical Institute Belgrade
Serbian inventions
Military equipment introduced in the 2010s